Keizersberg Abbey, also known as Mont César Abbey is a Benedictine monastery on the hill Keizersberg or Mont César in the north of the university town of Leuven, Belgium.

History

The site
The Keizersberg ("Caesar's" or "Emperor's hill") was the site of the castle around which the city of Leuven grew up, and which local legend connected with Julius Caesar. The castle was demolished in 1782 by order of Emperor Joseph II. On the east side of the same hill a commandery of the Knights Templars was built in 1187, which when the order was abolished came to the Knights Hospitallers in 1312. This was secularised by the French in 1798, when the church and larger buildings were demolished.

Beuron Congregation
A Benedictine house of studies was established in Leuven in 1888 by Dom Gerard van Caloen, rector of the abbey school of Maredsous Abbey, and land was acquired on the present site in the following year for the construction of a larger establishment, in which the remains of the old commandery were incorporated. The first major conventual block, the north wing, was completed in 1897. The abbey was formally founded on 13 April 1899 as part of the Beuron Congregation, under the first abbot, Dom Robertus de Kerchove.

Columba Marmion (declared Blessed in 2000), abbot of Maredsous, was also appointed prior of Mont César in 1906, which he remained until his death in 1923.

The foundation is perhaps best known in the English-speaking world under its French name, Mont César Abbey, for its connection both with Blessed Columba and with the reformer and ecumenist Dom Lambert Beauduin, who while a member of this community launched his liturgical movement from here in 1909, and began publication of the associated periodical "Les Questions Liturgiques et Paroissiales" in the following year. Dom Lambert left Mont César in 1925 to be prior of Amay Priory, established from Mont César, from where he later founded the famous Chevetogne Abbey.

In 1914 the buildings were severely damaged by fire, and the monks took refuge in another Beuronese house, Maria Laach Abbey in the Rhineland, until after the end of the war, when reconstruction was possible.

Belgian Congregation
In 1921 the abbey moved from the Beuron Congregation to become part of the new Belgian Congregation of Our Lady (Belgische Congregatie van Onze-Lieve-Vrouw-Boodschap), under the presidency of Abbot Robertus. In 1929 publication began of the theological journal "Recherches de Théologie Ancienne et Médiévale".

Dom Bruno (Henri Reynders), famous for hiding many Jewish children from the Nazis during World War II, was a monk of Mont César from 1922 until 1968. A fellow monk at the abbey provided him with several skillfully forged identification cards.

The abbey again suffered damage in World War II with the bombing of the buildings during air raids on Leuven in 1944, which among other things destroyed the last remains of the older buildings from the time of the Hospitallers, and the monastery was temporarily uninhabitable.

By 1948 it was sufficiently restored to be able to set up a small community at Wavreumont in Stavelot, which was formally established as St. Remaclus' Priory on 21 June 1952.

Subiaco Congregation
When the French section of the Catholic University of Leuven was moved out of Leuven it was decided that the abbey should become a Flemish institution, whence the change from Mont César to Keizersberg. On 10 June 1968 the abbey was transferred to the Flemish Province of the Subiaco Congregation. The abbot and prior resigned in the same year, and a temporary administrator was appointed.

In 1969 part of the renovated abbey was converted for use as student accommodation, and is still used for that purpose.

In 2020, a part of the Medieval wall collapsed.

As of 2022, there were five monks in residence at Keizersberg.

Beer
The abbey's name is used commercially by a brewer under license, but the monastery has never itself been involved in brewing.

Abbots
 Dom Robertus de Kerchove 1899-1928
 Dom Bernard Capelle 1928-1952
 Dom Rombout Van Doren 1952-1968
 Dom Filips De Cloedt (acting abbot-administrator) 1968-1970
 Dom Ambroos Verheul 1970-1991
 Dom Livien Bauwens (acting prior-administrator) 1991-1993
 Dom Kris Op de Beeck 1993-2017
Dom Dirk Hanssens was appointed as prior-administrator in 2018

References

External links
 Keizersberg Abbey website 
 Benedictines - Abbey Keizersberg, Leuven in ODIS - Online Database for Intermediary Structures 
 Archives of Benedictines - Abbey Keizersberg, Leuven in ODIS - Online Database for Intermediary Structures

Christian monasteries in Flemish Brabant
Benedictine monasteries in Belgium
Buildings and structures in Leuven
Religious organizations established in 1899